Park Dae-un (born 12 September 1961) is a South Korean sports shooter. He competed in the men's 10 metre air rifle event at the 1984 Summer Olympics.

References

1961 births
Living people
South Korean male sport shooters
Olympic shooters of South Korea
Shooters at the 1984 Summer Olympics
Place of birth missing (living people)